"Like Wow – Wipeout" is a song written by Dave Faulkner and recorded by Australian rock group Hoodoo Gurus for their album Mars Needs Guitars!. It was released in October 1985 as the second single from the group's second studio album, Mars Needs Guitars! and peaked at number 16 on the Australian charts.

In June 2000, DaveFaulkner said "...[it] was only recorded as a b-side but producer Charles Fisher thought it "had something" and should be included on the album. No-one was more surprised than us when it became the second single and our biggest hit at the time. We just liked it because it was noisy.".

Track listing
 7" single (BTS1588)
 "Like Wow – Wipeout!" — 3:09
 "Bring the Hoodoo Down" — 3:01

Personnel
Credits:
 James Baker — drums
 Clyde Bramley — bass, backing vocals 
 Dave Faulkner — lead vocals (track A), guitar
 Mark Kingsmill — drums, cymbals
 Brad Shepherd — guitar, lead vocals (track B), harmonica
 Producer — Charles Fisher
 Engineer — John Bee
 Mastering — Don Bartley

Charts

References

1985 singles
Garage punk songs
Hoodoo Gurus songs
1985 songs
Songs written by Dave Faulkner (musician)